Poleth Isamar Méndes Sánchez also simply known as Poleth Mendes (born 4 February 1996) is an Ecuadorian Paralympic athlete. She along with her younger sister Anaís Méndez claimed the first medals for Ecuador in the history of the Paralympics. Both have the unique distinction of being the only siblings combination to be the first two Paralympic medalists for a country.

Méndes and her sister share different spelling of their surnames due to a clerical error in the civil registry.

Career 
She made her maiden Paralympic appearance representing the Ecuador at the 2016 Summer Paralympics. She was also the flag bearer for Ecuador during the 2016 Summer Paralympics Parade of Nations. She also claimed a silver medal in the women's shot put F20 category at the 2017 World Para Athletics Championships.

She clinched gold medal with a new world record of 14.39 in the women's F20 shot put event during the 2020 Summer Paralympics. Coincidentally, her sister won bronze medal in the same discipline making it a rare instance of athletes coming from same family who go on to win medals in a same competition. Poleth Isamar Mendes Sanchez won Ecuador's first ever gold medal in Paralympics history while her younger sister Anaís Méndez won Ecuador's first ever bronze medal in Paralympics history. Prior to the 2020 Summer Paralympics, Ecuador had never won a Paralympic medal.

References 

1979 births
Living people
Ecuadorian female shot putters
Paralympic gold medalists for Ecuador
Athletes (track and field) at the 2016 Summer Paralympics
Athletes (track and field) at the 2020 Summer Paralympics
Paralympic athletes of Ecuador
Paralympic medalists in athletics (track and field)
Medalists at the 2020 Summer Paralympics
Medalists at the World Para Athletics Championships
People from Imbabura Province
Medalists at the 2019 Parapan American Games
21st-century Ecuadorian women